Macedon is an unincorporated community in Mercer County, in the U.S. state of Ohio.

History
Macedon was laid out in 1838. A post office was established at Macedon in 1841, and remained in operation until 1904.

References

Unincorporated communities in Mercer County, Ohio
Unincorporated communities in Ohio